Crataerina pacifica is a species of biting fly in the family of louse flies Hippoboscidae. It has been found in the nest of the Pacific swift (Apus pacificus).

References

External links 

Parasitic flies
Parasites of birds
Diptera of Asia
Hippoboscidae